A Jog-A-Thon is a type of fund-raising event used by various schools and non-profit organizations to raise money via donations.  A survey of 1000 K through 8 principals by the National Association of Elementary School Principals (NAESP) dated March 29, 2007 indicated that 94% of them relied upon fundraisers to supplement school income.  Thus, due to the rising costs of education, Jog-A-Thons have become one fundraising method that can be used by both public and private schools.

Rules
During a Jog-A-Thon, participants jog as many laps as they can within a specified time period, usually less than an hour. The course that is jogged (or walked) can be designed in such a way as to take into account the grade level and the ability of the participants running during the specified time period, but everyone has fun'''.

Sponsorship
The goal for each Jog-A-Thon participant is to earn as much money as possible from as many sponsors as possible.  A sponsor can pledge money based either upon number of laps completed by the participant or by a fixed dollar amount that is irrespective of number of completed laps.

Issues
Some of the issues with Jog-A-Thons that can cause difficulty are tracking participant laps, billing sponsors that pledged to contribute based upon the number of laps a participant runs, and general tracking and management of the effort.  There is software available, though, that can alleviate these issues and assist organizations in running a successful Jog-A-Thon.

References
Pledge Form Templates for Jog-a-thons

Online Fundraising Blog that describes how to run a school jog-a-thon